In enzymology, an isoorientin 3'-O-methyltransferase is an enzyme that catalyzes the chemical reaction

S-adenosyl-L-methionine + isoorientin  S-adenosyl-L-homocysteine + isoscoparin

Thus, the two substrates of this enzyme are S-adenosyl methionine and isoorientin, whereas its two products are S-adenosylhomocysteine and isoscoparin.

This enzyme belongs to the family of transferases, specifically those transferring one-carbon group methyltransferases.  The systematic name of this enzyme class is S-adenosyl-L-methionine:isoorientin 3'-O-methyltransferase. This enzyme is also called isoorientin 3'-methyltransferase.

References 

 

EC 2.1.1
Enzymes of unknown structure
O-methylated flavones metabolism